Jesús Alberto Alcántar Rodríguez (born 30 July 2003) is a Mexican professional footballer who plays as a centre-back for Liga 3 club Sporting CP B, on loan from Necaxa.

Club career
Born in Caborca, Sonora, Alcántar started his career with Cimarrones de Sonora before a move to Club Necaxa in 2020. After making his first team debut in February 2022, he was loaned to Portuguese club Sporting CP to play for their 'B' team.

International career
Alcántar was called up to the under-20 team by Luis Ernesto Pérez to participate at the 2021 Revelations Cup, appearing in three matches, where Mexico won the competition. In June 2022, he was named into the final 20-man roster for the CONCACAF Under-20 Championship, in which Mexico failed to qualify for the FIFA U-20 World Cup and Olympics.

Career statistics

Club

Honours
Mexico U20
Revelations Cup: 2021, 2022

References

2003 births
Living people
People from Caborca
Footballers from Sonora
Mexico youth international footballers
Association football defenders
Liga MX players
Cimarrones de Sonora players
Club Necaxa footballers
Sporting CP footballers
Sporting CP B players
Mexican expatriate footballers
Mexican expatriate sportspeople in Portugal
Expatriate footballers in Portugal
Mexican footballers